2-Acetyl-5-methylfuran is an organic compound with the chemical formula .

References

Furans